John Hannah (born 25 October 1962) is an English former footballer who played in the Football League as a forward for Darlington. He also played non-league football for Fryston Colliery Welfare and Scarborough. Hannah, who had been working as an electrician at Kellingley Colliery, joined Darlington on a non-contract basis, and played for them during the 1984 miners' strike.

References

1962 births
Living people
Footballers from Wakefield
English footballers
Association football forwards
Fryston Colliery Welfare F.C. players
Darlington F.C. players
Bury F.C. players
Scarborough F.C. players
English Football League players